is the debut solo studio album by Japanese musician Cornelius. It was released on February 25, 1994 by Trattoria Records.

The First Question Award peaked at number four on the Oricon Albums Chart. Four singles were released from the album, all of which reached the top 40 on the Oricon Singles Chart: "The Sun Is My Enemy" (number 15), "Perfect Rainbow" (number 29), "(You Can't Always Get) What You Want" (number 27), and "Moon Light Story" (number 40).

Track listing

Personnel
Credits are adapted from the album's liner notes.

 Keigo Oyamada – vocals, guitar, arrangement

Additional musicians ("Cornelius Rock 'n' Roll Orchestral Circus")

 Toshio Araki – trumpet (tracks 1, 7)
 Asa-Chang – percussion (track 4)
 Aska Strings – strings (tracks 5, 7, 10, 11)
 Shigeo Fuchino – saxophone, flute (tracks 5, 6)
 Masato Honda – saxophone (track 9)
 Riki Imanari – synthesizer operation
 Daisuke Kawai – keyboards (tracks 2, 4–6, 9–11)
 Masahiro Kobayashi – trumpet (tracks 3, 5, 6, 8–11)
 Daisaku Kume – keyboards (tracks 1, 3, 7)
 Osamu Matsumoto – trombone (tracks 5, 6, 8)
 Mecken – bass (tracks 2, 5, 7, 9)
 Toyoaki Mishima – synthesizer
 Maki Nomiya – vocals (track 10)
 Mami Otomo – vocals (track 4)
 Masakuni Takeno – saxophone, flute (tracks 5–7)
 Yoshié Toda – drums, percussion
 Hitoshi Watanabe – bass (tracks 4, 6, 10, 11)
 Nobuo Yagi – harmonica (track 4)
 Hisashi Yoshinaga – saxophone, flute (tracks 6, 9)

Production

 Keigo Oyamada – production
 Yasunobu Arakawa – recording jammer
 Osamu Hirose – mixing (tracks 5, 9)
 Yoshiaki Katou – coordination
 Yuka Koizumi – mastering
 Ken Makimura – executive production
 Tatsuhiko Mori – mixing (track 6)
 Ken-Ichi Okeda – direction
 Ichiro Oka – recording direction
 Tohru Takayama – mixing (tracks 1–4, 7, 8, 10, 11)
 Zin Yoshida – mixing (track 1)

Design

 Contemporary Production – design
 Michio Fukuda – hair, makeup
 Shindo & Tajjiemax – photography
 Hiroko Umeyama – styling

Charts

References

External links
 
 

1994 debut albums
Cornelius (musician) albums
Japanese-language albums